Río Gallegos Air Base is a main military airfield in Santa Cruz Province, Argentina in the far south of the nation. 

It was the nearest air base to the Falklands Islands in the 1982 war.

History
It opened in June 1952.

Falklands War
Ernesto Horacio Crespo, the head of the F.A.S, coordinated attacks on the islands from the base, which was 380 miles to the west of the Falklands Islands.

References

External links
 Airfield history

1952 establishments in Argentina
Argentine Air Force bases
Argentine Air Force units and formations in the Falklands War
Buildings and structures in Santa Cruz Province, Argentina
Military airbases established in 1952